The women's Mass Start at the 2017 KNSB Dutch Single Distance Championships in Heerenveen took place at Thialf ice skating rink on Friday 30 December 2016.

Result

Source:

References

Single Distance Championships
2017 Single Distance
World